Hemopressin (Hp) is an alpha hemoglobin fragment with the sequence PVNFKFLSH, originally identified in extracts of rat brain using an enzyme capture technique. It binds cannabinoid receptors, acting as an inverse agonist at CB1 receptors. Longer forms of hemopressin containing 2-3 additional amino acids on the N-terminus have been identified in extracts of mouse brain. These longer hemopressin peptides, named RVD-Hpα and VD-Hpα, bind to CB1 receptors and were originally reported to be agonists. In addition to the Hp peptides from alpha hemoglobin, a related peptide from beta hemoglobin has been found in mouse brain extracts; this peptide, named VD-Hpβ, is also an agonist at CB1 cannabinoid receptors. Hemopressin is not an endogenous peptide but rather an extraction artefact [Bauer M, Chicca A, Tamborrini M, Eisen D, Lerner R, Lutz B, Poetz O, Pluschke G, Gertsch J. Identification and quantification of a new family of peptide endocannabinoids (Pepcans) showing negative allosteric modulation at CB1 receptors. J Biol Chem. 2012 Oct 26;287(44):36944-67. doi: 10.1074/jbc.M112.382481. Epub 2012 Sep 5.]. The only endogenous peptide found endogenously at physiological conditions is RVD-hemopressin (pepcan-12), which has more recently been shown to be a negative allosteric modulator of CB1 receptors and positive allosteric modulator of CB2 receptors [Bauer M, Chicca A, Tamborrini M, Eisen D, Lerner R, Lutz B, Poetz O, Pluschke G, Gertsch J. Identification and quantification of a new family of peptide endocannabinoids (Pepcans) showing negative allosteric modulation at CB1 receptors. J Biol Chem. 2012 Oct 26;287(44):36944-67. doi: 10.1074/jbc.M112.382481. Epub 2012 Sep 5.] [Petrucci V, Chicca A, Glasmacher S, Paloczi J, Cao Z, Pacher P, Gertsch J. Pepcan-12 (RVD-hemopressin) is a CB2 receptor positive allosteric modulator constitutively secreted by adrenals and in liver upon tissue damage. Sci Rep. 2017 Aug 25;7(1):9560. doi: 10.1038/s41598-017-09808-8.]. RVD-hemopressin (pepcan-12) is generated from a pro-peptide called pepcan-23 and these peptides are exclusively found in noradrenergic neurons in the brain and in the adrenal medulla [Hofer SC, Ralvenius WT, Gachet MS, Fritschy JM, Zeilhofer HU, Gertsch J. Localization and production of peptide endocannabinoids in the rodent CNS and adrenal medulla. Neuropharmacology. 2015 Nov;98:78-89. doi: 10.1016/j.neuropharm.2015.03.021. Epub 2015 Mar 31.]

The original Hp peptide reduces sensitivity to painful stimuli in an experimental model of hyperalgesia. Hp also reduces food intake in mice. However, it remains to be shown if Hp is an endogenous brain peptide. The original purification used boiling acid to extract the peptide from rat brain, and hot acid can specifically cleave D-P bonds. The N-terminally-extended forms RVD-Hpα and VD-Hpα may represent the true endogenous forms.

Role in diet
Scientists at the University of Manchester have discovered that hemopressin could be used as an appetite suppressant without having the side effects of many other drugs that are used for this purpose. In laboratory tests hemopressin was administrated to mice and rats, which significantly reduced food intake. Hemopressin works by affecting the reward centres of the brain which make us feel happy when we eat too much. A further research should be carried out in order to confirm these effects and the safety on people.

See also
 RVD-Hpα

References

Neuropeptides
Cannabinoids